Otter Ferry is a settlement on the Cowal peninsula in Argyll and Bute, Scotland, formerly the site of a ferry across Loch Fyne. Otter Ferry is situated 9 miles from Portavadie from where there is a ferry to Tarbert, in Kintyre, operated by Caledonian MacBrayne.

Gallery

References

External links

 Panorama from Otter Ferry Pier (QuickTime required)
 Gaelic place names of Scotland - website

Villages in Cowal
Highlands and Islands of Scotland